Sylvester Bernard Uphus (December 29, 1927 – January 1, 2017) was an American farmer and politician.

Born on a farm near Greenwald, Minnesota, Uphus served in the United States Navy during World War II. He went to the College of Saint Benedict and Saint John's University after which he became a farmer. He served on the Ashley Township board. He served in the Minnesota House of Representatives from 1983–92 as an Independent Republican. He lived in Sauk Centre, Minnesota. A nephew was Steve Dehler, who also served in the Minnesota Legislature. Uphus died in Sauk Centre, three days after his 89th birthday.

Notes

1927 births
2017 deaths
People from Stearns County, Minnesota
Military personnel from Minnesota
Farmers from Minnesota
College of Saint Benedict and Saint John's University alumni
Republican Party members of the Minnesota House of Representatives
Catholics from Minnesota